Chanatip Sonkham or Chanapa Sonkham (born 1 March 1991) is a Thai taekwondo practitioner who was the bronze medalist at the 2012 Summer Olympics in the under 49 kg weight class. Sonkham also won bronze medals at the 2010 Asian Games and at the Asian Taekwondo Championships in 2010 and 2012. She won the gold medal at the 2013 World Championship.

References

External links
 

1991 births
Living people
Chanatip Sonkham
Chanatip Sonkham
Chanatip Sonkham
Taekwondo practitioners at the 2012 Summer Olympics
Chanatip Sonkham
Olympic medalists in taekwondo
Asian Games medalists in taekwondo
Taekwondo practitioners at the 2010 Asian Games
Medalists at the 2012 Summer Olympics
Chanatip Sonkham
Taekwondo practitioners at the 2014 Asian Games
Chanatip Sonkham
Chanatip Sonkham
Medalists at the 2010 Asian Games
Medalists at the 2014 Asian Games
Universiade medalists in taekwondo
Chanatip Sonkham
Southeast Asian Games medalists in taekwondo
Competitors at the 2015 Southeast Asian Games
Chanatip Sonkham
World Taekwondo Championships medalists
Chanatip Sonkham
Asian Taekwondo Championships medalists
Medalists at the 2015 Summer Universiade
Medalists at the 2009 Summer Universiade
Chanatip Sonkham